Dominique Earl Easley (born April 28, 1992) is a former American football defensive tackle. He played college football at Florida.  He was drafted by the New England Patriots in the first round of the 2014 NFL Draft.

High school career
Easley attended Curtis High School in Staten Island, New York, where he played football and competed in track. In football, he was selected to play in the 2010 Under Armour All-America Game in St. Petersburg, Florida, where he announced his commitment to attend the University of Florida.

Easley also competed in track & field as a junior. At the 2009 PSAL Borough Championships, he won the shot put event, with a throw of 40 ft, and placed 10th in the 55-meter dash, with a time of 7.44 seconds. He took 8th in the shot put at the 2009 PSAL City Champs, with a PR of 43 ft 7 in.

Considered a five-star recruit by ESPN.com, Easley was listed as the No. 1 defensive tackle in the nation in 2010.

College career
Easley accepted an athletic scholarship to attend the University of Florida, where he played for coach Urban Meyer and coach Will Muschamp's Florida Gators football teams from 2010 to 2013.

As a true freshman in 2010, Easley played sparingly, playing in six games and totaling four tackles.  In 2011, he started all 12 regular-season games, before suffering a torn ACL against Florida State.  He recorded a total of 37 tackles on the season, finishing tied for fifth on the team with 7.5 tackles for a loss.  In 2012, he played in and started eleven games, missing two games due to injury.  He collected 26 tackles on the season, including 8.5 tackles for a loss and a team leading four quarterback sacks, while adding a fumble recovery.  In 2013, Easley's senior season was cut short after tearing his ACL in practice leading up to the Kentucky game.  He totaled five tackles, including two for a loss.

On September 30, 2013, just a few days after it was reported he would miss the rest of the college football season, Easley announced he would forgo his remaining eligibility and enter the NFL Draft.

Professional career

New England Patriots
Easley was selected by the New England Patriots in the first round (29th overall) of the 2014 NFL Draft. The team signed him to a four-year contract on June 23, 2014. According to Ian Rapoport, the contract is for $7.3 million.

On September 7, 2014, Easley played in his first NFL regular season game, a 33–20 road loss to the Miami Dolphins. He would record his first career interception (off former Patriot Matt Cassel) the following week during a 30–7 win over the Minnesota Vikings. On December 17, the Patriots placed Easley on injured reserve. In 11 games of his rookie season, Easley finished with 9 tackles, 1 sack, 1 pass defended, and 1 interception.

Without Easley, the Patriots won Super Bowl XLIX after they defeated the defending champion Seattle Seahawks 28–24.

After the departure of longtime starter Vince Wilfork, Easley began the 2015 season as one of the Patriots' starting defensive tackles. On December 15, 2015, the Patriots placed Easley on injured reserve once again, ending his season. He ended the season with 15 tackles and two sacks.

In an unexpected move, the Patriots released Easley on April 13, 2016.

Los Angeles Rams
On May 17, 2016, Easley signed a one-year contract with the Los Angeles Rams after working out with the team. He played in all 16 games for the Rams in 2016, recording 35 tackles, 3.5 sacks, one pass deflected and two forced fumbles.

On March 7, 2017, the Rams placed an original round (first-round) tender on Easley. On May 4, 2017, Easley signed his tender with the Rams. During training camp, Easley suffered a torn ACL, his fourth in his football career and second time in the NFL; he was then ruled out for the 2017 season.

On March 19, 2018, Easley signed a one-year contract to remain with the Rams. On October 3, 2018, Easley was placed on injured reserve after undergoing another knee surgery. Without Easley, the Rams reached Super Bowl LIII where they lost 13-3 to Easley's former team the New England Patriots.

Personal life
Easley's mother is of Haitian descent.

Dominique has one older brother David Easley and one younger sister Destinee Easley who is a student at the New York Film Academy in Burbank, CA.

Easley is a Muslim. He declared on his Twitter account that he converted to Islam on March 13, 2015.

See also

 List of Florida Gators in the NFL Draft
 List of Los Angeles Rams players
 List of New England Patriots players

References

External links
Los Angeles Rams bio
New England Patriots bio
Florida Gators bio

1992 births
Living people
African-American Muslims
Sportspeople from Staten Island
Players of American football from New York City
American football defensive tackles
American sportspeople of Haitian descent
American Muslims
Florida Gators football players
New England Patriots players
Los Angeles Rams players
Under Armour All-American football players
Curtis High School alumni
Converts to Islam